Don't Go in the Woods may refer to:

Don't Go in the Woods (1981 film), a 1981 slasher film directed by James Bryan
Don't Go in the Woods (2010 film), a 2010 horror musical directed by Vincent D'Onofrio